Frogtown is a neighborhood in Saint Paul in the U.S. state of Minnesota. Built around University Avenue, the Thomas-Dale neighborhood is colloquially known as Frogtown (meaning "Frogmountain"). Historically, Frogtown was a subsection of the current Thomas-Dale neighborhood. It is bordered by University Avenue on the south, the Burlington Northern Railroad tracks to the north, Lexington Parkway on the west and Rice Street on the east.

Early settlement
The neighborhood was first settled 1860–1880 as the downtown area outgrew its borders. Workers on the St. Paul and Pacific Railroad, now BNSF Railway, which was built just to the north of the neighborhood sought housing nearby. Minnesota's first successful locomotive run occurred on these tracks in 1882. Shortly thereafter the Jackson Street Railroad Shops were built just northeast of Frogtown. The Jackson Street Shops were then joined by other railroad related industries in the area including the Saint Paul Foundry, built near Como and Western Avenues, providing additional employment opportunities for residents.

Residential development moved westward through the neighborhood as Polish, Scandinavian, German, and Irish immigrants took blue-collar jobs in the area. They built modest wood frame and brick houses on small lots in the neighborhood. Urban renewal has wiped out many of these homes, but working-class Victorian homes from the 1880s are extant, some adorned with arched window and door openings, brick window hoods, and frilly intact open porches.

The name "Frogtown" likely comes from the fact that the neighborhood was developed over several swamps and marshes, which were filled in over time. Archbishop John Ireland referred to the area as “Froschberg” or "Frog City” because of the many frogs in the area originating from the swamps.

Commerce
Commercial buildings lined University Avenue as street cars along the corridor were able to efficiently transport workers to employers. The line also became the first intercity street car line, connecting Minneapolis with Saint Paul in 1890.

Today
Today many view Frogtown as a new enclave for Vietnamese and now Hmong immigrants, who, in Saint Paul, comprise the largest urban contingent in the United States. Amenities include a full-service bank, gas station, community medical clinic, family services organizations, two parks, several Asian supermarkets, a traditional butcher shop, several convenience stores, the historic No.18 Fire Station.

A profusion of immigrant-owned businesses line University Avenue, offering clothing, shoes, jewelry, household items, entertainment media (DVDs, CDs, video games) and groceries. Immigrants from Africa operate several Halal meat markets in the area, which also offer traditional African breads, spices and foodstuffs. Mexican-American immigrants operate small traditional Mexican carnicerías. The avenue is dotted with restaurants serving Cambodian, Thai, Laotian, Hmong, Vietnamese, Chinese-American and Mexican cuisine, some of it very authentic.

Transportation

The METRO Green Line light rail, which opened on June 14, 2014, serves the neighborhood with stops on University Avenue at Victoria Street, Dale Street, and Western Avenue.

Education
St. Paul Public Schools serves Frogtown. Some residents are zoned to Jackson Elementary, while some are zoned to Galtier Elementary. Some residents are zoned to Ramsey Middle, and some are zoned to Washington Middle. Some residents are zoned to Central High School, and some are zoned to Como Park High School.

The Catholic parish of St. Agnes also serves the area of Frogtown with its comprehensive elementary and high school (Saint Agnes School), classes of kindergarten through senior high school.

Saint Paul Public Library operates the Rondo Community Library adjacent to Frogtown. The newly renovated Rondo Library opened in late August 2006.

References

External links
Greater Frogtown Neighbors Forum - Online Group

Asian-American culture in Minneapolis–Saint Paul
Hmong-American culture in Minneapolis–Saint Paul
Neighborhoods in Saint Paul, Minnesota
Populated places established in the 19th century
Vietnamese-American history